Dean Baranja (born 9 October 1971) is a retired Slovenian football midfielder.

References

1971 births
Living people
Slovenian footballers
NK Beltinci players
NK Mura players
DSV Leoben players
Association football midfielders
Slovenian expatriate footballers
Expatriate footballers in Austria
Slovenian expatriate sportspeople in Austria
Slovenian PrvaLiga players